Mind: Path to Thalamus is a first-person puzzle video game created by Spanish indie developer Carlos Coronado, released on August 15, 2014.

Story
Mind begins with the protagonist asking himself, "How many times will I kill her?" The game then fades to Menorca, Spain, where a massive tornado approaches the town where the protagonist and his daughter, Sophia, are staying. Hinting that this is a flashback, the protagonist races to the house, calling Sophia's name, but loses consciousness when the tornado reaches the house.

The protagonist soon finds himself exploring a dream-like world, in which he solves puzzles within the environment and gives various monologues. Early on, the protagonist glimpses a massive tree, which he dubs "the Thalamus", and decides to head there, thinking he might find Sophia.

References

External links
 Official Steam page

Linux games
MacOS games
PlayStation 4 games
PlayStation VR games
2014 video games
Unreal Engine games
Video games developed in Spain
Windows games